Yang Yang (Chinese: 杨洋; born 26 June 1991 in Shangrao, Jiangxi province) is a Chinese athlete specialising in the sprinting events. He won the silver medal with the Chinese 4 × 100 metres relay at the 2011 Summer Universiade.

A student of broadcasting at the Beijing University, he represented his country at three consecutive Summer Universiades.

Competition record

Personal bests
Outdoor
100 metres – 10.24 (+1.8 m/s) (Gwangju 2015)
Indoor
60 metres – 6.55 (Nanjing 2016)

References

1991 births
Living people
Chinese male sprinters
Asian Games medalists in athletics (track and field)
Asian Games gold medalists for China
Medalists at the 2014 Asian Games
Athletes (track and field) at the 2014 Asian Games
Universiade medalists in athletics (track and field)
Universiade silver medalists for China
People from Shangrao
Runners from Jiangxi
Competitors at the 2013 Summer Universiade
Competitors at the 2015 Summer Universiade
Medalists at the 2011 Summer Universiade